Cinema 2: The Time-Image (French: Cinéma 2, L'image-temps) (1985) is the second volume of Gilles Deleuze's work on cinema, the first being Cinema 1: The Movement-Image (1983). Cinema 1 and Cinema 2 have become to be known as the Cinema books, and are complementary and interdependent texts.

Using the philosophy of Henri Bergson, Deleuze offers an analysis of the cinematic treatment of time and memory, thought and speech. The book draws on the work of major film-makers like Fellini, Antonioni and Welles.

Toward the time-image

The first three chapters of Cinema 2 each outline a number of ways of approaching the time-image. The first chapter looks at a number of filmmakers who were precursors to and early proponents of time-images. The second chapter takes a taxonomical approach, reviewing Cinema 1 and showing how the time-image goes beyond the movement-image. While the third chapter introduces two more movement-images in order to better differentiate time-images.

Beyond the movement-image
In the first chapter of Cinema 2, Deleuze picks up where he left off in Cinema 1 to discuss how the time-image is born from a crisis of the movement-image. Thus, instead of the perception-images, affection-images, action-images, and mental images of the movement-image, there are opsigns and sonsigns which resist movement-image differentiation. Deleuze explores opsigns and sonsigns through the cinema of the Italian neorealists and Japanese director Yasujirō Ozu. As David Rodowick writes: 'In the absence of a predetermined trajectory' the image becomes 'what Deleuze calls opsigns and sonsigns, or pure optical and acoustical images.'

From movement-image to time-image
Deleuze then goes on – in the second chapter – to give a partial overview of Cinema 1 from the perspective of his taxonomical project, before once again deriving opsigns and sonsigns.

Limit of movement-images
In the third chapter of the book, Deleuze discusses recollection-images (flashbacks) and dream-images. These images seem – says Deleuze – to be time-images, however, they remain movement-images. Nonetheless, they point the way toward time-images.

Types of time-image

The second part of Cinema 2 concerns Deleuze’s classification of types of movement-image, which he will summarize in the second section of chapter 10, the final chapter of the book, and the conclusion to both Cinema books:
opsigns and sonsigns
hyalosigns (or crystal-images)
chronosigns
noosigns
lectosigns

Taxonomy of time-images

In Cinema 1, Deleuze’s use of the semiotics of Charles Sanders Peirce allowed him to expand the taxonomy of movement-images. However, in Cinema 2 Deleuze does not provide any rationale for his taxonomy and there has been some debate as how this creation arises.

Difference and Repetition
According to Rodowick, 'time-images emerge from what Deleuze calls, in Difference and Repetition, the three passive syntheses of time'. A number of other theorists have gone on to suggest very different relations between Deleuze's full taxonomy of cinema and Difference and Repetition. However, in 2011 David Deamer published an essay titled 'A Deleuzian Cineosis: Cinematic Semiosis and Syntheses of Time' in what was then called Deleuze Studies, which returned to Rodowick's brief comment and explored the claim in depth, writing 'the impetus for the taxonomy of the time-image lies in the account given of the three passive syntheses of time in Difference and Repetition,' and 'the nine aspects of the passive syntheses can be seen to correspond to the nine proper signs of the time-image'. Deamer went on to develop this relation between Cinema 2 and Difference and Repetition in Deleuze's Cinema Books: Three Introductions to the Taxonomy of Images (2016). Therein he sees a much wider connection, and goes on to show how it goes beyond the concerns of just the temporal syntheses, writing on the 'three constitutive syntheses of time, space, and consciousness' and that 'it is these three constitutive syntheses that can be seen to inspire the structure of the time-image taxonomy.'

Cineosis

Deamer coins the term "cineosis" to describe Deleuze's "cinematic semiosis", designating the images and the images with signs.

See also
 Cinema 1: The Movement Image

References
Specific

General

Bergson, Henri (2002) [1896]. Matter and Memory. New York: Zone Books. 
Bogue, Ronald (2003). Deleuze on Cinema. New York & London: Routledge. 
Colman, Felicity (2011). Deleuze & Cinema: The Film Concepts. Oxford & New York: Berg. 
Deamer, David (2016). Deleuze's Cinema Books: Three Introductions to the Taxonomy of Images. Edinburgh: Edinburgh University Press. 
Deleuze, Gilles (2002) [1983]. Cinema 1: The Movement Image. London & New York: The Athlone Press. 
Deleuze, Gilles (2005) [1985]. Cinema 2: The Time Image. London & New York: The Athlone Press. 
Rodowick, D. N. (1997). Gilles Deleuze's Time Machine. Durham & London: Duke University Press.

Bibliography

Primary texts
Deleuze, Gilles. Cinema 1: The Movement Image. Trans. Hugh Tomlinson and Barbara Habberjam.  London & New York: The Athlone Press, 1989.
Deleuze, Gilles. Cinema 2: The Time Image. Trans. Hugh Tomlinson and Robert Galeta. London & New York: The Athlone Press, 1989.
Bergson, Henri. Matter and Memory. Trans. N. M. Paul and W. S. Palmer. New York: Zone Books, 2002.
Peirce, Charles Sanders. "Pragmatism and Pragmaticism" in Collected Papers of Charles Sanders Peirce: Volume V and VI. Eds. C. Hartshorne and P. Weiss, Cambridge, MA: Belknap Press of Harvard University Press, 1974

Secondary texts
Bogue, Ronald.  Deleuze on Cinema.  New York and London: Routledge, 2003.
Colman, Felicity. Deleuze & Cinema: The Film Concepts. Oxford & New York: Berg, 2011
Deamer, David. Deleuze's Cinema Books: Three Introductions to the Taxonomy of Images. Edinburgh: Edinburgh University Press, 2016.
Rodowick, D.N.  Gilles Deleuze's Time Machine.  Durham, NC: Duke University Press, 1997.

Further reading
Buchanan, Ian and Patricia MacCormack, eds.  Deleuze and the Schizoanalysis of Cinema.  London and New York: Continuum, 2008.
Deamer, David. Deleuze, Japanese Cinema, and the Atom Bomb: The Spectre of Impossibility. New York: Bloomsbury, 2014.
Flaxman, Gregory (ed.).  The Brain is the Screen: Gilles Deleuze and the Philosophy of Cinema.  Minneapolis: University of Minnesota Press, 2000.
Martin-Jones, David.  Deleuze and World Cinemas.  London and New York: Continuum, 2011.
MacCormack, Patricia.  Cinesexuality.  Aldershot, England and Burlington, VT: Ashgate, 2008.
Marrati, Paola.  Gilles Deleuze: Cinema and Philosophy.  Trans. Alisa Hartz.  Baltimore, MD: Johns Hopkins University Press, 2008.
Pisters, Patricia.  The Matrix of Visual Culture: Working With Deleuze in Film Theory.  Stanford, CA: Stanford University Press, 2003.
Powell, Anna.  Deleuze and Horror Film.  Edinburgh: Edinburgh University Press, 2006.
---.  Deleuze, Altered States, and Film.  Edinburgh: Edinburgh University Press, 2007.
Rodowick, D.N., (ed.).  Afterimages of Gilles Deleuze's Film Philosophy.  Minneapolis: University of Minnesota Press, 2010.
Shaviro, Steven.  The Cinematic Body.  Minneapolis: University of Minnesota Press, 1993.
Skoller, Jeffrey. Shadows, Specters, Shards: Making History in Avant-Garde Film. University of Minnesota press, 2005.

Works by Gilles Deleuze
1985 non-fiction books
Books of film theory
French non-fiction books